Sergey Rost (real name   Sergey Anatolyevich Titivin; born March 3, 1965, Leningrad, RSFSR, USSR) is a Russian actor, screenwriter, television and radio.

Biography 
Born March 3, 1965 in a family of engineers Raisa Ivanovna (née Netkova]) and Anatoly Fyodorovich Titivin. His mother hails from the Ukraine, part of the family lives in Melitopol. Has Bulgarian roots. Named in honor of Sergey Yesenin. He graduated from the Leningrad Theatre Institute as a theater director.

I worked with Dmitry Nagiyev radio  Modern.

Great popularity earned him a humorous program Look Out! Modern, In which he not only played both male and female roles, but also in collaboration with Anna Parmas wrote over 300 scripts to her. In January 2004,  Look Out! Modern 2  was closed after the controversy erupted with the actor of the transfer Dmitry Nagiyev, who suggested growth remained now only a writer, and the role of the program, the project Nagiyev will be invited to perform stars of cinema and show business. Growth is not agreed with the partner offer. According to another version, the cause of the differences is the financial contradictions.

His wife Olga, by profession a journalist. Daughter Alisa (born March 13, 2011).

Filmography 
1996—1999: Look Out! Modern as different roles
 1997: Purgatory as Bogdan Klyots
1999—2000:  Full Modern! as different roles
1999: Streets of Broken Lights as Vitya 
 2001—2004: Look Out! Modern 2  as different roles
2001:  Detectives as waiter
2002: Two Fates as photographer
2003: Mongoose as informant Suslikov
 2005: Two Fates 2 as Edik
2005: The Right to Love as Mikhail Bondarev
2005: Queen of the Petrol Station 2 as DJ Accident
2007: When it Does Not Expect as Andrey
2007: Reserve Fear as Coyote
2008: Kings Can Do Everything as Vadim Gudashkin, hairdresser
2009: My as Garik
2009: Keys to Happiness as Producer
2010: Liteyny, 4 as Anton
2011: Trap for Pinocchio (was not completed)
2011: Last Minute as Georgy Alexandrovich, film director
2011: Secrets of Investigation as Stanislav Valeryevich Alsufiev
2011: Taxi as Valerik2012: Baby as Barkov
2014: Univer. New Dorm as editor in chief 
2014: Turn on the Turn as Nikolai Baskov's assistant 
2015: Londongrad as Boris Brickman, lawyer
2015: SOS, Santa Claus, or Everything will come true! as Yakov Ilyich Scriabin
 2015: Happiness is... as policeman
 2016: Snoop as Arkady Vasilyevich Chubarov
 2017: Saving  Pushkin as publisher
 2018: Story of One Appointment (episode)
  2018: Anyone but Them as gangster
 2018: Let's Get A Divorced! as landlord

 Voice 
2001: Shallow Hal'' as Hal Larson (Russian voice)
2016: Police Department as director of the theater

References

External links
 
 Official website
 Сергей Рост на Радио «Модерн»

1965 births
Living people
Male actors from Saint Petersburg
Russian male film actors
Russian male television actors
Russian male voice actors
Russian television presenters
Russian radio personalities